Mukasa is a surname. Notable people with the surname include:

Adolphus Ludigo-Mukasa (1861–1886), Ugandan Roman Catholic martyred for his faith
Mukasa Mbidde (born 1973), Ugandan lawyer, human-rights activist, politician
Ashe Mukasa (born 1952), former Ugandan football midfielder
Basammula-Ekkere Mwanga II Mukasa (1868–1903), Kabaka of Buganda from 1884 until 1888 and from 1889 until 1897
Ham Mukasa (1868–1956), page in the court of Mutesa I of Buganda and later secretary to Apolo Kagwa
Joseph Mukasa Balikuddembe (1860–1885), Ugandan Roman Catholic recognized as a martyr and saint by the Catholic Church
Roger Mukasa, (born 1989), Ugandan cricketer
Ruben Spartas Mukasa (1899–1982), religious reformer in Uganda
Wilson Muruli Mukasa, Ugandan politician
Joseph Mukasa Zuza (1955–2015), Roman Catholic bishop
Nathan Mukasa (born 2004), Ugandan/Trinidadian OutKast

See also
Mukasura
Mukhtasar
Muklassa